The Peppermint Prince is a Canadian children's television series which aired on CBC Television from 1956 to 1957.

Premise
Episodes consisted of cartoons and puppetry as hosted by the Peppermint Prince (John Chappell)  Dave Orcutt directed the puppetry for the series.

Scheduling
This 15-minute series was broadcast as follows (times in Eastern):

References

External links
 

CBC Television original programming
1956 Canadian television series debuts
1957 Canadian television series endings
1950s Canadian children's television series
Black-and-white Canadian television shows
Canadian television series with live action and animation
Canadian television shows featuring puppetry